Claresholm was a provincial electoral district in Alberta mandated to return a single member to the Legislative Assembly of Alberta using the first past the post method of voting from 1909 to 1929.

History

The Claresholm electoral district was formed prior to the 1909 Alberta general election from the northern portion of the Macleod electoral district. The electoral district would be renamed Nanton-Claresholm prior to the 1930 Alberta general election.

Malcolm McKenzie was elected the first MLA for Claresholm in the 1909 election, McKenzie was the incumbent, having been elected to the Macleod electoral district in 1905. McKenzie's margin of victory in Claresholm was much larger than he had achieved in 1905

Premier Arthur Sifton appointed McKenzie Provincial Treasurer. In keeping with the era's custom, McKenzie responded to the cabinet appointment by resigning his seat in the legislature to contest it in a by-election. Despite his previous wide margins, in 1912 he carried Claresholm by only 14 votes.

McKenzie's tenure as treasurer was not to last long: he caught a chill while attending the convention that nominated him as the Liberals' Claresholm candidate in the 1913 election, and by the time he returned to Edmonton on March 10, 1913, he was sufficiently ill to confine himself to bed. He had developed peritonitis, and died from it early in the morning of March 15. The Liberal Edmonton Bulletin, in mourning his passing, said that "no lawyer in the province had such a firm grasp in legal matters. No member of the house performed his legislative duties so admirably and so well. He has left his impression on more legislation than any other member."

In the 1917 Alberta general election, Louise McKinney became the first woman sworn into the Legislative Assembly of Alberta, and the first woman elected to a legislature in the British Empire. She served in the Alberta legislature from 1917 to 1921 as a member of the Non-Partisan League. McKinney defeating Liberal incumbent and former Mayor of Claresholm William Moffat. She was one of two women elected to the Legislative Assembly that year, the other being Roberta MacAdams. Later McKinney was one of the Famous Five who campaigned successfully for the right of Canadian women to be appointed to the Senate.

McKinney ran for a second term in the 1921 Alberta general election as a member of the United Farmers. She was defeated by Independent Farmer candidate Thomas Milnes.

The electoral district is named for the Town of Claresholm, Alberta.

Election results

1900s

1910s

1920s

See also
List of Alberta provincial electoral districts
Claresholm, Alberta, a town in southern Alberta

References

Further reading

External links
Elections Alberta
The Legislative Assembly of Alberta

Former provincial electoral districts of Alberta
1909 establishments in Alberta